Joshua Kevin Stanley Parker (born 1 December 1990) is a professional footballer who plays as a striker for National League South side Oxford City and the Antigua and Barbuda national team.

Club career

Queens Park Rangers
Parker started his career at Queens Park Rangers (QPR). In January 2010 he joined Conference National club AFC Wimbledon on loan. He made just two substitute appearances for the club. On 10 April 2010 he made his Championship debut, replacing Adel Taarabt as a last-minute substitute, in a 2–0 win over Crystal Palace at Selhurst Park. He got his first start two weeks later in a 1–0 win at Barnsley. At the end of the season, manager Neil Warnock offered the youngster a new one-year deal. In October 2010, he joined League Two club Northampton Town on a month-long loan. He made only three appearances for the club and returned to QPR a week before the end of his contract. Parker then joined Wycombe Wanderers on 23 November 2010 on a three-month loan deal and made his debut on the same night against Torquay United, coming on as a second-half substitute. His loan spell was cut short when he suffered a stress fracture in his left foot while on international duty with Antigua and Barbuda. He returned to QPR but failed to make another appearance and was released at the end of the season following their promotion to the Premier League.

Oldham Athletic
Parker signed a one-year contract at Oldham Athletic on 5 August 2011 following a successful trial period and made his competitive club debut on the first day of the 2011–12 season, as a substitute in the Football League match against Sheffield United. On 8 March 2012, Parker joined League Two side Dagenham & Redbridge on loan.

He was released by Oldham at the end of the 2011–12 season, along with eight other players.

Oxford United
In December 2012 he signed on non-contract terms for Oxford United. He was released by the club in May 2013 after 15 league appearances without a goal.

Domžale and Red Star Belgrade
He signed with Slovenian side Domžale in June 2013. After a year and a half in the Slovenian First League, he moved to Serbian SuperLiga side Red Star Belgrade. On 8 January 2015 he signed a two-year contract with Red Star.

On 20 August 2015, he signed a short-term loan deal with Aberdeen until January 2016.

Gillingham
In January 2017 he joined Wealdstone of the National League South, but just two weeks later signed for League One side Gillingham until the end of the 2016–17 season. He scored in his first appearance for the side in a friendly against Belgian side Patro Eisden Maasmechelen and again on his full debut against Port Vale in the league, coming on as a substitute to score a 95th-minute equaliser. At the end of the season his initial short-term contract was extended for a further two years.

Charlton Athletic
Josh Parker joined Charlton Athletic as a late deadline day transfer, on a six-month contract.

He was released by Charlton at the end of the 2018–19 season.

Wycombe Wanderers
Parker signed for Wycombe Wanderers on 1 August 2019. He scored his first goal for Wycombe when he scored in an EFL Trophy tie against Milton Keynes Dons on 12 November 2019.

Burton Albion
On 15 January 2021, Parker joined Burton Albion on a one-and-a-half year deal.

On 31 August 2021, it was announced that Parker had left Burton Albion by mutual consent.

Oxford City 
After appearing for Risborough Rangers on a non-contract basis, Parker signed for National League South side Oxford City on 12 September 2022, making his debut on the same day in a 1–0 league defeat to Chelmsford City. Having scored five goals across the month, Parker won the league's Player of the Month award for January 2023.

International career
Parker is eligible to represent Antigua and Barbuda. In November 2010, he received a call-up and accepted an invitation along with his former QPR teammate Mikele Leigertwood to play for the national team in the Caribbean Championship qualifiers being hosted in St. John's, Antigua and Barbuda on 10–14 November. Parker won his first cap in a 2–1 victory over Suriname on 10 November 2010, playing the full 90 minutes. He was part of Antigua and Barbuda team at the 2010 and 2014 Caribbean Cup. He was made captain of the side in 2015.

Personal life
In March 2016, he was a contestant on Channel 4's Couples Come Dine with Me (Season 3, Episode 33) which was filmed in Aberdeen during his time on loan.

Career statistics

Club

International
Scores and results list Antigua and Barbuda's goal tally first, score column indicates score after each Parker goal.

Honours
Charlton Athletic
EFL League One play-offs: 2019

Wycombe Wanderers
EFL League One play-offs: 2020

Individual
National League South Player of the Month: January 2023

References

External links
Profile at the official Queens Park Rangers website

1990 births
Living people
Sportspeople from Slough
Antigua and Barbuda footballers
Antigua and Barbuda international footballers
English footballers
Association football midfielders
AFC Wimbledon players
Queens Park Rangers F.C. players
Northampton Town F.C. players
Wycombe Wanderers F.C. players
Oldham Athletic A.F.C. players
Dagenham & Redbridge F.C. players
Burton Albion F.C. players
Oxford United F.C. players
NK Domžale players
Red Star Belgrade footballers
Aberdeen F.C. players
Gillingham F.C. players
Charlton Athletic F.C. players
Oxford City F.C. players
Slovenian PrvaLiga players
English Football League players
National League (English football) players
Serbian SuperLiga players
Scottish Professional Football League players
2014 Caribbean Cup players
Antigua and Barbuda expatriate footballers
English expatriate footballers
Expatriate footballers in Serbia
Expatriate footballers in Slovenia
English sportspeople of Antigua and Barbuda descent
Footballers from Berkshire